Daykundi, also spelled as Daikundi, Daikondi, or Daykondi, is one of the thirty-four provinces of Afghanistan, located in the central part of the country. It has a population of about 516,504 and is a Hazara province.

Daykundi Province was carved out of the northern part of Uruzgan Province in 2004, becoming a separate province. It falls into the traditionally ethnic Hazara region known as the Hazaristan and the provincial capital is Nili. It is surrounded by Bamyan Province in the northeast, Ghazni Province in the southeast, Uruzgan Province in the south, Helmand Province in the southwest, and Ghor Province in the northwest.

History
Daykundi was established on March 28, 2004, when it was created from the isolated Hazara-dominated northern districts of neighboring Uruzgan Province.

Development and security
The province maintains its security through the Afghan police and military.

While the Government of Afghanistan, NGOs, the United Nations, and NATO's ISAF forces have had little involvement in reconstruction in the province, there have been some initiatives. Following heavy rainfall and flooding in February 2007 the United Nations Assistance Mission for Afghanistan (UNAMA) opened a sub-office in the province and Oxfam, one of the few NGOs operating in the province, described UNAMA's input into coordinating flood relief as impressive.

In November 2007 a World Food Programme convoy carrying mixed food aid was forced to abandon its mission due to security concerns and Afghanistan's Interior Ministry confirmed that Taliban insurgents had infiltrated the southern district of Kajran in a bid to destabilize the province. On 11 November 2007 Afghan forces launched a military operation to drive out the insurgents.

The United States began building new government institutions in the province. The insurgency problem and shortage of food continued until 2012. Several government officials have warned in October 2012 that "If the government or NGOs (non-governmental organizations) do not address the situation with proper assistance, Daikundi would witness many deaths this winter." In the meantime, a rebel leader along with his 150 fighters joined the government-initiated peace drive in Nili, capital of Daikundi province.

Notable people

Daykundi has a lot of famous writers, researchers, artists, athletes, authors, and story writers, for example:

 Sarwar Danish, lawyer, and politician, who is the second vice president of Afghanistan.
 Muhammad Hussain Sadiqi Nili, was a politician and a jihadist leader in Afghanistan.
 Sadiqi Zada Nili, a politician.
 Asadullah Saadati, a politician.
 Sarwar Sarkhosh, a singer.
 Dawood Sarkhosh, a singer.
 Hussain Sadiqi, an athlete who won in some competitions in the world.
 Shakardokht Jafari, a Medical Physicist who is a Medical Physicist and an award-winning innovator based at the Surrey Technology Centre. She developed an efficient and low-cost method of measuring a medical dose of radiation.
 Fatema Akbari, an entrepreneur.
 Sahraa Karimi, a Movie maker.
 Ali Payam, a story writer, researcher, journalist, and lawyer who written and has published 27 books that contain fiction, law, politic and governance, and folklore.
 Hamza Waeezi, a writer.
 Kawa Ayric, a Drama writer.
 Zahra Mahmoodi, a Former Captain of Afghanistan Women's National Football Team.
 Hosain Haidarbigi
 Ali Najafi
 Sakina Mohammadi

Media
There are four radio stations in Daykundi, such as Sadaye Nili, Nasim, Aftab, and Milli Radio.

Demographics

As of 2020, the total population of Daykundi province is estimated to be around 516,504, which is mostly a rural tribal society. The ethnic Hazaras make up the majority of the total population of the province. All the inhabitants follow Islam, with Shi'as the majority and Sunnis as the minority. Languages spoken in the province include Dari or Hazaragi.

Geographic 
The province of DaiKundi is located in central Afghanistan. The province is bordered on the south by Uruzgan, on the east by Ghazni and Bamiyan, on the north and west by Ghor, and the southeast by Helmand. Until March 2004, Dai Kundi was part of Uruzgan province. The Helmand River separates nearly 90 percent of the steep landscape.

Livelihood 
Daykundi is a mountainous province that is green and dominated by trees, bushes, wild food plants and agricultural land.

Most people have their small orchards producing almonds and fruits which they sell them to the market later on. Also, they take care of their animals very carefully and seriously as Livestock is one of the important sources of income and food for them; some of them have goats and sheep while few have their own cattle.

The labor opportunities are very few in the Daykundi province as most of the households go to other provinces in Afghanistan to look for seasonal work. 70% of the household income are coming from family members who are working outside Daykundi; this is one of the main livelihood options for the people of Daykundi.

Agriculture in Daykundi 
The dry weather of Daykundi and its uncertainty of precipitation make farmers concerned about their farm products. They are mostly relying on irrigated land, as they are afraid they do not lose their time, capital, and their labors.

As Daykundi does not have enough rainfall, there is a low capacity for wheat, orchard crops, beans, and vegetable production in cultivation; this makes the household members not have enough required food.

Daykundi people have less access to markets as there is a long distance from rural areas to local markets, poor road networks, snowstorms in the winter, and insecurity. However, people still sell their fruits and nuts to the traders at the farm gates, which get transported to the provincial center and regional markets.

Since the water for irrigation has decreased in Daykundi province, farmers are very concerned about their food production and pasture; even, this has affected farmland leasing. The farmers are not interested to contract lease lands as their crop production is lower and strongly relies on precipitation. Therefore, farmland leasing has decreased in Daykundi province.

The dry weather of Daykundi has not only affected farm production but also has negatively impacted livestock. The fodders and pastures are not enough and sufficient for the animals and they get common diseases like Tuberculosis, PPR (Peste Des Petits Ruminants), Sheep pox, foot and mouth diseases, etc.Even the dairy preservation is very poor in which milk and dairy are not sold in the market, except Kurut.

The only season that dairy products are consumed is during the spring season between April and June. The rest of the year, people in Daykundi do not have access to better nutrition status and try to import dairy products, like yogurt, from other provinces.

Taking care of fruit trees is the most important agricultural part of Daykundi. The most common fruits are almonds, mulberry, and walnuts. The districts of Shahristan, Miramor, and Ishtarlari are the main and major producers of these fruits.

Also, fruit tree plantations, which are mostly apples and almonds, have been increased and supported by NHLP, National Horticulture and Livestock Project.

Market and Agriculture 
The Market of Daykundi is pretty functional throughout the year but it has its struggles over the winter season as communications become difficult.

As a result of the above situation, the market and traders in the district centers make enough food stocks at their household level to ensure that there are enough stocks during the winter season.

Almond Festival Celebration in Day Kundi 
The first Gole Badam Festival was celebrated in Daykundi Province three years ago. In 2010, the Hazara People International Network recommended that this Festival be held to commemorate the blossoming of the almond tree.

Almonds are the province's principal agricultural commodity, and many households rely on them for livelihood. While the rest of Afghanistan is known for its opium production, Hazaristan, particularly Daykundi, has opted to focus on almond agriculture.

The city's Almond Festival, an annual event hosted by the province government, drew nearly 4,000 people from all across Dai Kundi to each celeb on yearly basis.

Almond cultivation is a major contributor to the Dai Kundi economy, and the almond festival brings together farmers, citizens, and government officials to enjoy and pray for a plentiful harvest. Almonds are the only significant commodity produced in Dai Kundi that is exported outside of Afghanistan.

According to the Ministry of Agriculture, Dai Kundi produces over 5,500 tons of almonds every year, accounting for around 11% of Afghanistan's total almond production. Zabul, Ghazni, Samangan, and Balkh are other important almond-growing regions.

Districts

Daikundi province has 10 districts: Nili, Sangi Takht, Khadir, Gizab, Ishtarlay, Miramor, Shahristan, Kajran, Kiti, and Pato.

Economy

Agriculture is the main industry of the province. It is well known for its high-quality almonds, which are distributed throughout Afghanistan.

Climate in DayKundi 
Daikundi is the most vulnerable province to Climate Change in Afghanistan. The province experiences acute water shortages and droughts have poor soil quality, and risks of avalanches, landslides, and flooding, which cause extensive damage to agricultural land, infrastructure, and food security.

The impacts of climate change in Daikundi are manifold, mostly due to the limited institutional capacity to plan and respond to these impacts.

With support from the Global Environment Facility (GEF), United Nations Environment Programme (UNEP) and the National Environmental Protection Agency (NEPA) are cooperating on pilot field demonstrations in Daikundi province that aim to build environment adaptive and resilience of vulnerable villages to climate change impacts.

The above-mentioned organization also aims to build the capacity of local institutions to address climate change risk within the peri-urban extent of the rapidly developing Nili Town.

Women Cycling Event 
On Thursday, July 12, 2018, a bicycle competition was organized in the provincial stadium in Daikundi province, in the center of Afghanistan, between two teams of girls and boys.

The bicycle competition was held to promote peace and harmony throughout the country.

There were ten females and ten boys on each of the two teams, and medals, clothing, and other items were given to the winners.

It is important to mention that the purpose of the event was to promote peace and support girls’ role in sports, said Mohammad Husain Sirat, the provincial director of information and culture.

Death Rate 
The crude death rate was 0.42 (0.25-0.68) (95 percent CI) and the under-five death rate was 0.66 (0.29-1.51) respectively (95 percent CI). Both rates are below the SPHERE emergency levels.

See also

 Provinces of Afghanistan
 Daikundi (Hazara tribe)

References

External links

 , April 6, 2018, TOLOnews.
 , May 25, 2016, United Nations Population Fund (UNFPA).
 , December 26, 2011, TOLOnews/USAIDAfghanistan.
 Video: B-Roll, Daykundi Province Handover to GIRoA  by Defense Video & Imagery Distribution System

 
Hazarajat
Provinces of Afghanistan
States and territories established in 2004
Provinces of the Islamic Republic of Afghanistan